USS Hazelwood (DD-107) was a  built for the United States Navy during World War I.

Description
The Wickes class was an improved and faster version of the preceding . Two different designs were prepared to the same specification that mainly differed in the turbines and boilers used. The ships built to the Bethlehem Steel design, built in the Fore River and Union Iron Works shipyards, mostly used Yarrow boilers that deteriorated badly during service and were mostly scrapped during the 1930s. They had a crew of 6 officers and 108 enlisted men.

Performance differed radically between the ships of the class, often due to poor workmanship. The Wickes class was powered by two steam turbines, each driving one propeller shaft, using steam provided by four water-tube boilers.

The ships were armed with four 4-inch (102 mm) guns in single mounts and were fitted with two  1-pounder guns for anti-aircraft defense. Their primary weapon, though, was their torpedo battery of a dozen 21 inch (533 mm) torpedo tubes in four triple mounts. In many ships a shortage of 1-pounders caused them to be replaced by 3-inch (76 mm) anti-aircraft (AA) guns. They also carried a pair of depth charge rails. A "Y-gun" depth charge thrower was added to many ships.

Construction and career
Hazelwood, named in honor of John Hazelwood, was laid down 24 December 1917 by Union Iron Works, San Francisco, California, launched 22 June 1918 and commissioned 20 February 1919. Following shakedown and a voyage to Norfolk for supplies, Hazelwood departed New York for the Mediterranean 15 April 1919. Reaching Gibraltar 9 May, she participated in training and served as escort to Arizona (BB-39). After patrolling the Mediterranean, she departed Malta 28 July and arrived New York 13 August. Next day she got underway for her new home waters, the Pacific. Sailing via Cuba and Panama, she arrived at San Francisco 5 September. After operations along the West Coast, she decommissioned at San Diego 7 July 1922.

Hazelwood recommissioned 1 April 1925, and participated in training and readiness exercises with units of the Pacific Fleet for the next five years. She decommissioned again 15 November 1930, at San Diego, was sold to Learner and Rosenthal 30 August 1935, and was scrapped 14 April 1935.

Notes

References

External links
 NavSource Photos

 

Wickes-class destroyers
Ships built in San Francisco
1918 ships